"Don't Think I'm Not" is the debut solo single of American R&B singer Kandi from her debut album, Hey Kandi... (2000). Kandi co-wrote the song with Kevin "She'kspere" Briggs, Katrina Willis, and Bernard Edwards, Jr. and produced it alongside Briggs. Released on July 11, 2000, "Don't Think I'm Not" reached number 24 on the US Billboard Hot 100 and number 32 on the Billboard Hot R&B/Hip-Hop Singles & Tracks chart. Outside the US, the song reached the top 20 in Australia, the Netherlands, New Zealand, and the United Kingdom.

Music video
Kandi released a video for "Don't Think I'm Not" in 2000, directed by Bille Woodruff. Kandi filmed the video with a broken right leg after it was crushed between two cars shortly before filming began.

Track listings

 US and Canadian maxi-CD single
 "Don't Think I'm Not" (radio edit) – 3:50
 "Don't Think I'm Not" (LP version) – 4:04
 "Don't Think I'm Not" (hip hop remix) – 4:27
 "Don't Think I'm Not" (Ear Kandi Remix) – 4:02
 "Don't Think I'm Not" (LP instrumental) – 4:04

 US 12-inch single
A1. "Don't Think I'm Not" (radio edit) – 3:50
A2. "Don't Think I'm Not" (LP version) – 4:04
A3. "Don't Think I'm Not" (hip hop remix) – 4:27
B1. "Don't Think I'm Not" (Ear Kandi Remix) – 4:02
B2. "Don't Think I'm Not" (LP instrumental) – 4:04
B3. "Don't Think I'm Not" (LP a cappella) – 3:24

 UK CD single
 "Don't Think I'm Not" (radio edit) – 3:50
 "Don't Think I'm Not" (hip hop remix) – 4:27
 "Don't Think I'm Not" (Soul Instep mix) – 4:57
 "Don't Think I'm Not" (Maurice's radio mix) – 3:53

 UK cassette single
 "Don't Think I'm Not" (radio edit) – 3:50
 "Don't Think I'm Not" (Maurice's Remixing mix) – 7:53
 "Don't Think I'm Not" (Digital Black & Groove club mix) – 7:14

 European CD single
 "Don't Think I'm Not" (LP version) – 4:04
 "Can't Come Back" (LP version) – 4:03

 European maxi-CD single
 "Don't Think I'm Not" (LP version) – 4:04
 "Can't Come Back" (LP version) – 4:03
 "Don't Think I'm Not" (radio edit) – 3:50
 "Don't Think I'm Not" (Ear Kandi remix) – 4:02

 Australian CD single
 "Don't Think I'm Not" (radio edit) – 3:50
 "Don't Think I'm Not" (LP version) – 4:04
 "Don't Think I'm Not" (hip hop remix) – 4:27
 "Don't Think I'm Not" (Ear Kandi remix) – 4:02
 "What I'm Gon' Do to You" (LP version) – 3:50

Credits and personnel
Credits are lifted from the US maxi-CD single liner notes.

Studios
 Recorded at Triangle Sound Studios (Atlanta, Georgia)
 Mixed at Larrabee North (North Hollywood, California)

Personnel
 Kevin "She'kspere" Briggs – writing, MIDI and sound, production, recording
 Kandi Burruss – writing, vocals, background vocals, production, vocal production
 Katrina Willis – writing, background vocals, vocal production
 Bernard Edwards, Jr. – writing, MIDI and sound (as Focus)
 Brian Smith – recording
 Kevin "KD" Davis – mixing

Charts

Weekly charts

Year-end charts

Certifications

Release history

References

Kandi Burruss songs
2000 debut singles
2000 songs
Columbia Records singles
Miami bass songs
Music videos directed by Bille Woodruff
Songs written by Kandi Burruss